Sports in Arizona includes professional sports teams, college sports, and individual sports. All four major league sports teams in Arizona are based in the Phoenix metropolitan area.

Professional sports teams
Professional sports teams in Arizona include four major league sports teams, plus minor league and semi-pro teams:

College sports
With three state universities and one private university in NCAA Division I, and several community colleges, college sports are also prevalent in Arizona. The intense rivalry between Arizona State University and the University of Arizona predates Arizona's statehood, and is one of the oldest rivalries in the NCAA. The thus aptly named Territorial Cup, first awarded in 1889 and certified as the oldest trophy in college football, is awarded to the winner of the "Duel in the Desert", the annual football game between the two schools. Both UA and ASU are members of the Pac-12 Conference, one of the so-called Power Five conferences in Division I FBS, the top tier of U.S. college football.

The other two Division I members in Arizona are Northern Arizona University in Flagstaff, which plays football in the second-level Division I FCS, and Grand Canyon University in Phoenix, a private school that does not sponsor football.

Arizona also hosts several college football bowl games. The Fiesta Bowl, originally held at Sun Devil Stadium, is now held at State Farm Stadium in Glendale. The Fiesta Bowl has been part of the College Football Playoff (CFP) since its creation for the 2014 season, and is paired with the Peach Bowl in Atlanta as rotating hosts of CFP semifinals. The Fiesta Bowl hosted a CFP semifinal in 2016, and will next host a semifinal in the 2019 season. University of Phoenix Stadium was also home to the 2007 and 2011 BCS National Championship Games and hosted Super Bowl XLII on February 3, 2008. It hosted the state's first Pro Bowl on January 25, 2015, Super Bowl XLIX on February 1, 2015, and the College Football Playoff National Championship on January 11, 2016. The stadium also hosted the Final Four of the 2017 NCAA Division I men's basketball tournament and 2024 NCAA Division I men's basketball tournament. The Cactus Bowl is currently played in Phoenix at Chase Field. It was first held at Arizona Stadium at the UA campus in Tucson, then moved to Chase Field when it was known as Bank One Ballpark, and then to Sun Devil Stadium before returning to Chase Field in 2015.

Individual sports
Due to its numerous golf courses, Arizona is home to several stops on the PGA Tour, most notably the Phoenix Open, held at the TPC of Scottsdale, and the WGC-Accenture Match Play Championship at the Ritz-Carlton Golf Club in Marana.  The lower-level Cactus Tour, for women golfers, is mostly in Arizona.

Auto racing is another sport known in the state. Phoenix International Raceway in Avondale is home to NASCAR race weekends twice a year. Firebird International Raceway near Chandler is home to drag racing, off-road racing and other motorsport events.

Baseball

Arizona is a popular location for Major League Baseball spring training, as it is the site of the Cactus League. The only other location for spring training is in Florida with the Grapefruit League. In 2009, the Los Angeles Dodgers opened a new spring training facility in Phoenix owned by Glendale, making them the 14th team in Arizona. Spring training has been somewhat of a tradition in Arizona since 1947 (i.e. the Cleveland Indians in Tucson until 1991, and the San Diego Padres in Yuma until 1992) despite the fact that the state did not have its own major league team until the state was awarded the Diamondbacks in Phoenix as an expansion team. The state currently hosts the following teams for spring training:

 Arizona Diamondbacks at Salt River Fields
 Chicago Cubs at Sloan Park in Mesa
 Chicago White Sox at Camelback Ranch-Glendale in Phoenix
 Cincinnati Reds at Goodyear Ballpark
 Cleveland Indians at Goodyear Ballpark
 Colorado Rockies at Salt River Fields
 Kansas City Royals at Surprise Stadium
 Los Angeles Angels of Anaheim at Tempe Diablo Stadium.
 Los Angeles Dodgers at Camelback Ranch-Glendale in Phoenix
 Milwaukee Brewers at Maryvale Baseball Park in Phoenix
 Oakland Athletics at Hohokam Stadium in Mesa
 San Diego Padres at Peoria Sports Complex
 San Francisco Giants at Scottsdale Stadium, but also in Papago Park of Phoenix
 Seattle Mariners at Peoria Sports Complex, but also in Chandler
 Texas Rangers at Surprise Stadium

Besides being home to MLB spring training, Arizona is also home to the Arizona Fall League. The Fall League was founded in 1992 and is a minor league baseball league designed for players to refine their skills and perform in game settings in front of major and minor league baseball scouts and team executives, who are in attendance at almost every game. The league got exposure when Michael Jordan started his time in baseball with the Scottsdale Scorpions.

See also
 Professional sports teams in Arizona

References

External links

 
Western United States